Varun Dhawan (born 24 April 1987) is an Indian actor who works in Hindi films. One of India's highest-paid actors, he has been featured in Forbes India Celebrity 100 list since 2014. He has starred in 11 consecutive box-office successes between 2012 and 2018.

The son of film director David Dhawan, he graduated in business studies from the Nottingham Trent University. He began his career as an assistant director to Karan Johar in My Name Is Khan (2010), and subsequently made his acting debut in 2012 with Johar's teen drama Student of the Year. He rose to prominence with leading roles in the romantic comedies Main Tera Hero (2014), Humpty Sharma Ki Dulhania (2014), and Badrinath Ki Dulhania (2017); the action comedies Dilwale (2015), Dishoom (2016), and Judwaa 2 (2017); the dance film ABCD 2 (2015); and the drama Sui Dhaaga (2018). 

Dhawan received praise and nominations for two Filmfare Awards for playing an avenger in the thriller Badlapur (2015) and an aimless man coping with loss in the drama October (2018). Following three critical and commercial failures, he starred in Jugjugg Jeeyo (2022).

Early life 

Dhawan was born on 24 April 1987 to David Dhawan, a film director, and Karuna Dhawan. His family is Punjabi Hindu. His elder brother, Rohit, is a film director known for his debut venture Desi Boyz, while his uncle, Anil, is an actor. He completed his HSC education from the H.R. College of Commerce and Economics. He has a degree in business studies from the Nottingham Trent University, United Kingdom. Prior to his acting career, he worked as an assistant director to Karan Johar on the film My Name Is Khan (2010).

Career

2012–2014: Early success 

Dhawan made his acting debut in 2012 with Johar's teen film Student of the Year alongside Sidharth Malhotra and Alia Bhatt. He was cast as Rohan Nanda, the teenage son of a rich businessman, who competes with his girlfriend (Bhatt) and best friend (Malhotra) to win an annual school championship. Film critic Taran Adarsh from Bollywood Hungama found Dhawan to be "a talent one can't help but marvel at" and CNN-IBN's Rajeev Masand added: "It's Varun Dhawan who stands out with a confident, charming turn, able to tackle both comical and vulnerable scenes with ease". Student of the Year was a commercial success, grossing  worldwide.

Dhawan next starred in the romantic comedy Main Tera Hero (2014), a remake of the Telugu film Kandireega, which was produced by Balaji Motion Pictures and directed by his father David. He played an impetuous brat who is involved in a love triangle. Raedita Tandon of Filmfare commended Dhawan on his comic timing and compared him favourably to Govinda and Prabhudheva. The film emerged as a commercial success grossing 780 million Indian rupees worldwide.

Dhawan then played Rakesh, a flirtatious Punjabi boy who engages in a romantic affair with an engaged Punjabi woman, in Shashank Khaitan's romantic comedy Humpty Sharma Ki Dulhania. Co-starring Bhatt, the film was described as a tribute to Dilwale Dulhania Le Jayenge (1995) by Johar, who served as producer. Rohit Khilnani of India Today praised his screen presence, and Nandini Ramnath of Mint noted how much he stood out in the "few quieter scenes" of the film. Humpty Sharma Ki Dulhania emerged as one of top-grossing Indian productions of the year, earning  worldwide.

2015–2018: Established actor 
The crime thriller Badlapur (2015) from director Sriram Raghavan saw Dhawan play Raghu, a father who over the course of 15 years avenges the murder of his wife and son. Portraying Raghu was a "terrifying" experience for Dhawan, who "slipped into depression as after a point it no longer felt like I was acting in a film". Raja Sen of Rediff.com praised his acting range, writing that he "sheds his easy-breezy charm  but, crucially, not his slightly hapless natural likeability  and bubbles up volcanically, his eyes frequently doing the talking." He received a Filmfare Award for Best Actor nomination for his performance.

Dhawan next starred opposite Shraddha Kapoor in the dance film ABCD 2, in which he portrayed the real-life character of Kings United founder Suresh Mukund, a dancer from Mumbai who went on to win the 2012 World Hip Hop Dance Championship. Critic Shilpa Jamkhandikar of Reuters criticised the feature, finding Dhawan to be the only asset of the film, writing that "except for the honest note he strikes, the rest of the film could have been just a bunch of music videos". ABCD 2 earned  worldwide; the film's commercial performance led Box Office India to consider it an emergence of Dhawan's star power. 

Dhawan's final appearance that year was in Rohit Shetty's ensemble action drama Dilwale, co-starring Shah Rukh Khan, Kajol and Kriti Sanon, in which he played the younger sibling of Khan's character. Despite mixed reviews from critics, the film proved to be a commercial success, grossing over  worldwide , emerging as Dhawan's highest-grossing release and one of the highest-grossing Bollywood films. He next appeared in the action cop comedy Dishoom (2016), directed by Rohit, alongside John Abraham and Jacqueline Fernandez, as a rookie Indo-Emirati cop. Despite mixed reviews, the film proved to be successful at the box office grossing over  worldwide.

Dhawan reunited with Khaitan and Bhatt for the romantic comedy Badrinath Ki Dulhania (2017), in which he played the titular character, a chauvinist fiancé to Bhatt's character. Shubhra Gupta of The Indian Express wrote that Dhawan "impresses as a boy-struggling-to-be-a-man". In addition, Tushar Joshi of Daily News and Analysis noted that "Varun Dhawan and Alia Bhatt prove that on screen chemistry can be enough sometimes to keep you engaged in an average plot with a predictable narrative". He received his second Best Actor nomination at Filmfare for the film. Later in 2017, he starred in his father's Judwaa 2, a reboot of his 1997 Salman Khan starrer Judwaa, alongside Fernandez and Taapsee Pannu. Both Badrinath Ki Dulhania and Judwaa 2 proved to be commercial successes, earning over  each. Forbes published that with nine consecutive box office hits and a 100% success ratio, Dhawan had established himself as a "bona fide Bollywood superstar".

Dhawan had two releases in 2018, Shoojit Sircar's drama October and Sharat Katariya's social problem film Sui Dhaaga. October, written by Sircar's frequent collaborator Juhi Chaturvedi, saw him portray Danish Walia, an aimless hotel management trainee whose life undergoes a series of changes when his co-worker goes into a coma. In a highly positive review, Anna M. M. Vetticad of Firstpost commended Dhawan for "effac[ing] his starry swagger and trademark cutesiness to play Dan"; Rohit Vats of Hindustan Times considered it to be his finest performance to date and wrote that "his humour is innate, but his understanding of pain and how it affects the human behaviour is even better". Sui Dhaaga featured Dhawan and Anushka Sharma respectively as Mauji and Mamta, a newly-wed couple in rural India who begin their own small-scale clothing business. Udita Jhunjunwala of Mint reviewed, "Dhawan has perfected the template for playing a simpleton. He brings a similar naiveté to Mauji, albeit endearingly." For October, he received a nomination for the Filmfare Critics Award for Best Actor.

2019–present: Career fluctuations 

Dhawan's sole screen appearance in 2019 was in Abhishek Varman's ensemble period drama Kalank, in which he was once again paired opposite Bhatt. Set in the 1940s prior to the partition of India, the film featured him as a womanising blacksmith; for the physical demands of the part, he trained extensively despite suffering from a knee injury and hamstring tear, and insisted on performing his own stunts. Saibal Chatterjee of NDTV was appreciative of Dhawan's against-type performance in it. Dhawan began the new decade with the dance film Street Dancer 3D (2020), which Namrata Joshi of The Hindu termed a "compilation of indistinguishable performances". Both Kalank and Street Dancer 3D did not perform well commercially, causing his career to suffer a setback. He worked with his father for a third time in Coolie No. 1, a 2020 adaptation of the Govinda-starrer 1995 film of the same name, which owing to the COVID-19 pandemic released online on Amazon Prime Video. Critical and public reception to the film was negative, largely in light of the nepotism debate due to actor Sushant Singh Rajput's death. In a scathing review, Shubhra Gupta of The Indian Express called the film a "zero wit, no flair" disaster, noting that Dhawan had "channelled Govinda in many of his films much better". 

In 2022, Dhawan starred alongside Kiara Advani in Jugjugg Jeeyo (2022), a comedy-drama about divorce. Writing for Hindustan Times, Monika Rawal Kukreja commended him for "add[ing] life to a complex character". It earned  worldwide to emerge as one of the highest-grossing films of the year. Dhawan played the title role in Bhediya, the third instalment in Dinesh Vijan's horror-comedy universe. The film was shot over a span of two months in various locations of Arunachal Pradesh. Sonal Dedhia of News18 wrote that he "is in full form and is a delight to watch as an egoistic prick-turned-reluctant-werewolf".

Dhawan will next star in Nitesh Tiwari’s action film Bawaal opposite Janhvi Kapoor. He will also be part of the Indian spinoff of the American drama series Citadel, created by the Russo Brothers, and directed by Raj Nidimoru and Krishna D.K.

Other work 

Alongside his acting career, Dhawan performs on stage and has co-hosted two award ceremonies. In 2013, he performed at the Filmfare, Screen, and Stardust award ceremonies, and at an event in Hong Kong. He hosted the 2013 Stardust Awards ceremony with Sidharth Malhotra and Ayushmann Khurrana, and a segment of the 59th Filmfare Awards. He was also part of the 20th Screen Awards, co-hosting the show alongside Shahrukh Khan and Richa Chadda. In 2013, he performed at a special event alongside Malhotra, Bhatt, Kapur, Kapoor, and Badlapur co-star Huma Qureshi to raise funds for the flood-affected victims of Uttarakhand.

In September 2014, Dhawan became the brand ambassador of newly formed Indian Super League club FC Goa. He also donated Rs. 30 Lakhs in PM-CARES Fund of Government of India during the COVID-19 pandemic in India.

Personal life and media image 
Dhawan has appeared in Forbes India Celebrity 100 list since 2014, peaking at the 15th position in 2018, when the magazine estimated his annual income to be  and listed him as one of the highest-paid celebrities in the country. In the same year, the Indian edition of GQ featured him among the nation's 50 most influential young people and labelled him as the "most bankable star of his generation".

On 24 January 2021, Dhawan married his long-time girlfriend, fashion designer Natasha Dalal.

Filmography

References

External links 

 
 
 

Punjabi Hindus
Living people
1987 births
Male actors in Hindi cinema
21st-century Indian male actors
Alumni of Nottingham Trent University
Punjabi people
Male actors from Mumbai
Screen Awards winners
Zee Cine Awards winners